A Cantabrian albarca is a rustic wooden shoe in one piece, which has been used particularly by the peasants of Cantabria, northern Spain.  In the neighbouring province of Asturias madreñas are still being widely used in rural areas. 

Cantabrian albarcas are similar to other clogs from Europe, but have significant features and different characteristics in terms of woodworking process and in their use. They have a characteristic set of three dowels on the bottom of the shoe.

See also
 Geta (footwear)
 List of shoe styles

References

Cantabrian culture
Cantabrian symbols
Spanish clothing
Spanish folklore
Footwear
Clogs (shoes)
Folk footwear
Footwear by country
Safety clothing
Shoes
Sandals